Edward Nowak (born 21 February 1940) is a Polish prelate of the Roman Catholic Church. He served as Assessor of the Equestrian Order of the Holy Sepulchre of Jerusalem and Canon of St. Peter's Basilica.

Nowak was born in Nowy Żmigród, and ordained to the priesthood on 6 January 1963 for the diocese of Przemyśl. In 1990, he was appointed Secretary of the Congregation for the Causes of Saints and was ordained Titular Archbishop of Luni. He received his episcopal consecration on 5 April 1990 from Pope John Paul II, with Archbishops Giovanni Battista Re and Justin Francis Rigali serving as co-consecrators. On 5 May 2007 Pope Benedict XVI named him as Assessor of the Equestrian Order of the Holy Sepulchre of Jerusalem in the Roman Curia.

References

1940 births
Living people
Polish Roman Catholic titular archbishops
Members of the Congregation for the Causes of Saints
20th-century Roman Catholics
21st-century Roman Catholics